DHD may refer to:
 Dima Halam Daogah, an armed militant group in Assam, India
 Deadline Hollywood Daily, an online magazine about the entertainment industry
 Digital High Definition or HD DVD, a discontinued high-density optical disc format
 Dial-Home Device, technology from the science-fiction TV series Stargate SG-1 used to tell the Stargate which planet to lock on to
 Dihydrodydrogesterone, a progestogen and metabolite of dydrogesterone